Merciera is a genus of plants in the family Campanulaceae. It contains 6 known species, all endemic to Cape Province in South Africa.

 Merciera azurea Schltr. 1897
 Merciera brevifolia A.DC. 1830
 Merciera eckloniana H.Buek in C.F.Ecklon & K.L.P.Zeyher 1837
 Merciera leptoloba A.DC. 1830
 Merciera tenuifolia (L.f.) A.DC. 1830
 Merciera tetraloba Cupido 2002

References

Campanuloideae
Campanulaceae genera
Flora of South Africa